Golden Arena may refer to:
The Croatian national film award presented at the Pula Film Festival:
Big Golden Arena for Best Film
Golden Arena for Best Actor
Golden Arena for Best Supporting Actor
Golden Arena for Best Actress
Golden Arena for Best Supporting Actress
Golden Arena for Best Cinematography
Golden Arena for Best Costume Design
Golden Arena for Best Director
Golden Arena for Best Film Editing
Golden Arena for Best Film Music
Golden Arena for Best Production Design
Golden Arena for Best Screenplay
Golden Spike Arena, a multi-purpose arena in Ogden, Utah, United States